Spy Rock is a pink granite dome located in the Llano Uplift in Mason County, Texas, rising  feet above sea level. The peak is located south of Fredonia.

As with Enchanted Rock, Spy Rock is formed of middle Precambrian material. The base of the peak can be reached by the public, but the dome itself is on private property and accessible only with property owner's permission. Federal and state statutes, regulations and rules governing trespassing, archeological sites and historic sites apply. The state Game Warden as a commissioned peace officer is authorized to inspect natural resources and take necessary action for the preservation of the resources.

Gallery

References

Granite domes
Landforms of Mason County, Texas
Monoliths of the United States
Rock formations of Texas